This page lists the city hospitals of Turkey. City hospitals are larger healthcare complexes in Turkey

List

In Service

Under construction

See also 
 List of hospitals in Turkey
 List of military hospitals in Turkey

References 

 City